Udgitha may be
a division of the Samaveda historically chanted in Vedic ritual by the Udgatr priest
a name of the mystical syllable  Om
a name of a medieval Hindu scholar, see Udgithacarya